Chris McQueen (born 3 August 1987) is an England international rugby league footballer who plays as a  or  for the Huddersfield Giants in the Super League.

He previously played for the Wests Tigers, Gold Coast Titans and the South Sydney Rabbitohs in the NRL, winning the 2014 NRL Grand Final with the Rabbitohs. He played for the Prime Minister's XIII and Queensland in the State of Origin series and played as a er and  earlier in his career. despite finishing on the losing side with Huddersfield McQueen was awarded the Lance Todd Trophy after being named player of the match in the 2022 Challenge Cup Final

Background
McQueen was born in Brisbane, Queensland, Australia. He grew up in country town of Kingaroy.

McQueen played his junior rugby league for the Kingaroy Red Ants. He is the nephew of Australian former Olympic swimmer Geoff Huegill. McQueen moved to Brisbane in 2006 to join the Wynnum Manly Seagulls, where he progressed through their Colts system to the Queensland Cup competition. In 2006, his first year playing with the Wynnum Manly Colts side, the team made the grand final, losing to a Norths Devils team that featured future NRL stars Israel Folau and Will Chambers.

Playing career

Early career
He played 9 Queensland Cup games in 2007 and cemented his spot in the starting side in 2008, playing 19 games. In 2008, he signed a two-year contract with the South Sydney Rabbitohs.

South Sydney Rabbitohs
McQueen joined South Sydney in 2009 and spent the majority of the season playing for the Rabbitohs feeder team, the North Sydney Bears in the New South Wales Cup competition. He made his NRL debut in Round 22 of the 2009 season, days after his 22nd birthday. A late call up to the side, McQueen played on the wing and scored a try in South Sydney's 36–22 win over the Manly-Warringah Sea Eagles. Due to injury, McQueen missed the entire 2010 season. He returned to first grade in 2011, playing almost every game for the South Sydney side, switching between wing and second row, and was named in Australia's 34-man Four Nations train on squad. Later that year he represented the Prime Minister's XIII against Papua New Guinea.

In 2012, he began the season again at wing, before making a permanent switch to second row. In 2013, McQueen cemented his spot in the South Sydney starting side. In 2012 and 2013, he was a member of Queensland's Emerging Origin Squad. In 2013, he made his State of Origin debut for Queensland. He played all three games of the 2013 State of Origin series in which Queensland extended their record for consecutive series victories to eight.

On 5 October 2014, McQueen was selected to play for South Sydney from the interchange bench in the 2014 NRL Grand final, helping them to a 30–6 victory over the Canterbury-Bankstown Bulldogs.

On 26 September 2015, McQueen again played for the Prime Minister's XIII against Papua New Guinea.

Gold Coast Titans
On 11 December 2015, McQueen signed a two-year contract with the Gold Coast Titans starting in 2016, after being released from the final year of his Souths contract.

Wests Tigers 
On 12 April 2017, it was announced that McQueen would join the Wests Tigers on a three-year deal, starting in 2018. McQueen started off the 2018 season playing for Intrust Super Premiership NSW side Western Suburbs after being unable to break into the starting 17 for The Tigers.  After spending the first 10 games in reserve grade, McQueen was called up to The NRL side for their Round 11 clash against Penrith.

McQueen was limited to only six games for the Wests Tigers in the 2019 NRL season.  McQueen instead spent most of the year playing for Western Suburbs in the Canterbury Cup NSW competition.

On 4 September 2020, McQueen was released by the Wests Tigers effective immediately.

Huddersfield
McQueen joined Huddersfield in the European Super League following his release from the Wests Tigers.  In round 2 of the 2022 Super League season, McQueen scored two tries for Huddersfield in a 26-12 victory over the Hull Kingston Rovers.
On 28 May 2022, McQueen played for Huddersfield in their 2022 Challenge Cup Final loss against Wigan. McQueen was awarded the Lance Todd Trophy as man of the match.

England
McQueen was called up to the England national team by coach Wayne Bennett for the test against Samoa on 6 May 2017. It was the first time that McQueen had accepted England after rejecting an approach for the 2013 World Cup in order to play for Queensland in the State of Origin. The Brisbane-born player qualifies for England through his father.

References

External links

Huddersfield Giants profile
Wests Tigers profile
NRL profile
Gold Coast Titans profile

1987 births
Living people
Australian expatriate sportspeople in England
Australian people of English descent
Australian rugby league players
England national rugby league team players
Gold Coast Titans players
Huddersfield Giants players
North Sydney Bears NSW Cup players
NRL All Stars players
People from Kingaroy
Prime Minister's XIII players
Queensland Rugby League State of Origin players
Rugby league centres
Rugby league locks
Rugby league second-rows
Rugby league wingers
South Sydney Rabbitohs players
Western Suburbs Magpies NSW Cup players
Wests Tigers players
Wynnum Manly Seagulls players
Lance Todd Trophy winners